Charles Nnaemeka Newuche (born 14 March 1985 in Imo State) is a Nigerian footballer who plays for Marsa.

Career
Newuche was nominated for the best player of his team by the fans in the 2008/2009 season. During that season, he scored 16 times for FC Zakarpattia Uzhhorod in the Persha Liha in Ukraine.

References

External links
Charles Newuche at MFA
Charles Newuche at Footballdatabase

1985 births
Living people
Footballers from Enugu
Nigerian footballers
Association football forwards
Bright Stars FC players
First Bank F.C. players
Lobi Stars F.C. players
FC Hoverla Uzhhorod players
FC Kolkheti-1913 Poti players
Nigerian expatriate footballers
Expatriate footballers in Ukraine
Nigerian expatriate sportspeople in Ukraine
Expatriate footballers in Israel
Nigerian expatriate sportspeople in Israel
Ukrainian Premier League players